Quitaque Creek is an intermittent stream about  long, originating as a shallow draw on the high plains of the Llano Estacado in Floyd County, Texas, and flowing eastward to join the North Pease River in Motley County, Texas.

Geography
The upland portion of Quitaque Creek is an ephemeral draw that flows only during heavy rain. The stream then continues in a northeasterly direction across the sparsely populated ranch lands of northeastern Floyd County.

Overall, Quitaque Creek descends  from its headwaters to its confluence with the North Pease River, passing through flat to moderately steep terrain along its course.

Proper name
Quitaque Creek has been known by various names including: Los Lingos Creek, North Pease River or Quitaque River.  In a 1948 decision of the United States Board on Geographical Names, "Quitaque Creek" was recommended as the proper name. In a letter written in 1967 by J. O. Kilmartin, Executive Secretary of Domestic Geographic Names, to a Miss Faye Farley of Houston, Kilmartin suggests that the name "Quitaque" appears to be related to the Quitaca Indians, one of the tribes that accompanied Juan Domínguez de Mendoza on his expedition from the middle Rio Grande to the interior of Texas in 1683-84.

See also
Salt Fork Red River
Mulberry Creek
Little Red River (Texas)
Pease River
Double Mountain Fork Brazos River
List of rivers of Texas

References

External links

Rivers of Texas
Tributaries of the Red River of the South
Bodies of water of Motley County, Texas